Borderland is a provincial electoral district in the Canadian province of Manitoba.   The riding was created by the 2018 provincial redistribution out of parts of Emerson and Morden-Winkler.

Election results

2019 general election

References

Emerson, Manitoba
Manitoba provincial electoral districts